Michael R. Rampino is a Geologist and Professor of Biology and Environmental Studies at New York University, known for his scientific contributions on causes of mass extinctions of life. Along with colleagues, he's developed theories about periodic mass extinctions being strongly related to the earth's position in relation to the galaxy. "The solar system and its planets experience cataclysms every time they pass "up" or "down" through the plane of the disk-shaped galaxy." These ~30 million year cyclical breaks are an important factor in evolutionary theory, along with other longer 60-million- and 140-million-year cycles potentially caused by mantle plumes within the planet, opining "The Earth seems to have a pulse," He is also a research consultant at NASA's Goddard Institute for Space Studies (GISS) in New York City.

Rampino's research has been concentrated in several areas including: studies of climate change on various timescales; the products and dynamics of volcanic eruptions and their effects on the global environment; and the relationship of large asteroid and comet impacts, and massive flood-basalt volcanism, with mass extinctions of life.

His most recent work has sought a connection between geologic events and astronomical processes, including encounters of Earth with dark matter in the Galaxy.

Rampino's interest in Astrobiology is evidenced by the text, “Origins of Life in the Universe”, co-authored with Robert Jastrow (Cambridge University Press, 2008), and a new book, “Cataclysms: A New Geology for the 21st Century” (Columbia University Press, 2017).

Rampino received his B.A. from Hunter College of CUNY and a Ph.D. in geological sciences from Columbia University. He was a post-doc at the NASA, Goddard Institute for Space Studies in New York City and Lamont–Doherty Earth Observatory in Palisades, New York studying climate change. He was an Associate Research Scientist at the NASA, Goddard Institute for 5 years, studying the effects of volcanic eruptions on climate, before taking up his present position at NYU.

At New York University, Rampino teaches the popular astrobiology course, “Earth, Life & Time” on the evolution of the Universe.  He won an NYU “Golden Dozen” teaching award in 2011.
He was instrumental in convening three American Geophysical Union Chapman Conferences on “Volcanoes and Climate” in 1992 (Hilo, Hawaii), 2002 (Santorini, Greece) and 2012 (Selfoss, Iceland) and two international meetings on “Small Bodies in the Solar System” in Mariehamn, Sweden (1994) and in Hikon, Japan (1997). He has been a visiting professor at Tohoku University and Yamaguchi University in Japan, the University of Florence and University of Urbino in Italy, and the University of Vienna in Austria and a lecturer for the annual Urbino Summer School in Paleoclimatology.

Rampino's research has been funded by NASA, the United States Department of Energy, the American Philosophical Society, and the National Science Foundation.

Fields of study

Climate change on various timescales 
Rampino has been interested in climatic changes on time scales ranging from decades to hundreds of millions of years (Paleoclimatology). Early work centered on multi-year climate cooling after explosive volcanic eruptions, the post-glacial rise in sea level over the last 10,000 years, and glacial/interglacial climate and sea level over the last 150,000 years. In papers with Ken Caldeira at the Carnegie Institution, he explored the relationships of seafloor-spreading rates, atmospheric  and climate in the very warm mid-Cretaceous Period 100 million years ago. They also considered the so-called “Goldilocks Problem” of Earth's habitability. More recent research is focused on the effects of flood-basalt volcanism and asteroid/comet impacts on climate and biological evolution. Rampino proposed the radical idea that some “glacial” deposits in the geologic record are actually impact-related debris flows.

Effects of volcanic eruptions on the global environment 
Rampino has investigated the climatic and environmental effects of stratospheric aerosol clouds produced by explosive volcanic eruptions. With his colleagues Stephen Self, now at UC Berkeley and Richard Stothers of the Goddard Institute for Space Studies he studied the volcanic production of atmospheric sulfate aerosols using volcanological measurements of magmatic sulfur release, observations of volcanic aerosol clouds, and the record of atmospheric phenomena and climate changes after volcanic eruptions from historical accounts (including the ancient literature), and from the record of volcanism contained in polar ice cores

These studies included detailed field investigations of the historic 1883 eruption of Krakatoa, the 1963 eruption of Mount Agung and the 1815 eruption of Mount Tambora in Indonesia, and their climatic aftermath. The famous “year without a summer” in 1816, during which Mary Shelley was forced to stay indoors to write Frankenstein, followed the great Tambora eruption. One focus of investigation is the huge “supereruption” (a word coined by Rampino and Self) of Mount Toba (now Lake Toba) in Sumatra ~74,000 years ago. This event may have created a severe “volcanic winter” (another term coined by Rampino) leading to a human population crash predicted from studies of the human genome. Such large eruptions threaten civilization.

Asteroid and comet impacts, massive volcanism and mass extinctions of life 
Rampino became interested in the catastrophic effects of asteroids and comet impacts when it was discovered that the Chicxulub asteroid impact event (66 million years ago) had created the huge Chicxulub crater in Mexico, and led to the extinction of many forms of life, including the dinosaurs. Rampino has studied the globally distributed evidence for the Chicxulub impact with fieldwork in Europe, the western United States, Mexico and the Caribbean. After a periodic 26-million year cycle was proposed for mass extinctions of life in 1984, Rampino and Stothers reported a similar cycle in the ages of impact craters on the Earth. To explain the cycles, they proposed the “Shiva Hypothesis” in which the 30-million year oscillation of the Solar System through the dense Galactic plane leads to periodic comet showers on Earth.

More recent work has centered on the severe Permian–Triassic extinction event (252 million years ago), with fieldwork in South Africa, Hungary, Japan, India and China, particularly focused on the so-called “fungal event” marking the devastation of Late Permian vegetation. Rampino and colleagues found evidence that the mass extinction of 96% of marine species and much of life on land may have occurred in a brief period of only a few thousand years, suggesting some sort of cataclysm  It turns out that this extinction occurred at the same time as the massive eruption of the Siberian Flood basalts. In 2017, Rampino and colleagues, studying the record of the great extinction, discovered a coincident worldwide layer rich in nickel that had been released by emanations from the huge eruptions. He and Caldeira concluded that most of the mass extinctions in the last 260 million years seem to have been associated with environmental catastrophes caused by either large impacts or flood-basalt eruptions.

In 2017–18, Rampino contributed popular articles on mass extinctions, impacts and the Galaxy to American Scientist and Astronomy Magazines.

Connections between geologic events and Earth’s interactions with Dark Matter 

In 1993, Rampino and Caldeira reported a ubiquitous 26-million year cycle in geologic plate tectonic and volcanic activity. More recently, Rampino related this cycle to the Solar System's oscillation through the plane of the Milky Way Galaxy, which has a similar period. He attributes the Earth's internal-activity cycle to the planet's encounters with clumps of mysterious dark matter in the Galactic plane. Astrophysicists suggested that the dark matter particles can become trapped within the Earth where they self-destruct, releasing large amounts of heat and leading to periodic pulses in the planet's internal geologic activity. Thus, geologic activity on the Earth may be modulated by astrophysical circumstances.

Media 
Rampino has appeared in many documentaries produced by PBS NOVA (Mystery of the Mega-Volcano, and Volcano!), BBC Horizon (Under the Volcano), the Discovery Channel (Three Minutes to Impact; Amazing Earth), the National Geographic Channel (Earth-Staying Alive), the History Channel (Story of Moses and the Plagues of Egypt), Japanese TV (Space and Life) and has appeared on local and national news programs (ABC, CBS, NBC, CNN, PBS, Fox News, and others). He is listed in the Internet Movie Data Base (IMDb) for appearances in Supervolcanoes (2000); Mystery of the Minoans (2001); The Day The Earth Nearly Died (2002); Last Days of Earth (2006); Inside the Volcano (2006); Krakatoa (2008); Super Volcano: Yellowstone's Fury (2013); Doomsday Volcanoes (2013); What on Earth? (2015); and The Dark Matter Enigma (2017).

Books 
Rampino has published two books, a text for a course on Astrobiology (Jastrow and Rampino, 2008) and a popular portrayal of the effects of catastrophic events on Earth history and the history of life (Rampino, 2017). He was co-editor of the conference volume “Climate: History, Periodicity and Predictability” published in 1987.

External links 
 
 Astronomy.com podcast: How long will life last on Earth?
 NYU news: NYU professor's research reveals significance of Earth's movements
 Science20: Gradual Evolution Not Supported By Geological History, Says Geologist
 YouTube: What caused mass extinctions 
 Newsweek: Did Dark Matter Kill the Dinosaurs? How Mass Extinctions Are Linked with Universe’s Mystery Ingredient
 New Scientist: Cataclysms: A life spent chasing planetary catastrophe
 Sci-news: New Study Reveals Link between Mass Extinction Events and Comet/Asteroid Showers
 The Atlantic: The Chilling Regularity of Mass Extinctions
 PlanetSave: Earth's Interior Affects Long-Term Sea-Level and Climate Change
 Futurity: Does Darwin's theory hold up?
 ICR: NYU Prof Sides with Matthew, Not Darwin, on Fossil Record
 IFL Science: A Massive Impact Crater May Be Hiding Near The Falklands
 Live Science: Plumes of Molten Rock Could Drive Biodiversity, Climate Cycles
 ABC Australia: Volcano helped dinosaurs gain upper hand
 Historical Climatology: The Global Cooling Event of the Sixth Century. Mystery No Longer?
 The Washington Post: Solar Cycle Of Cataclysms
 Independent UK: The Great Dying: Earth's biggest mass extinction 'caused by Siberian volcanoes' 250 million years ago
 American Scientist: Michael Robert Rampino
 Facebook.com: Michael Rampino

References 

Year of birth missing (living people)
Living people
American geologists
New York University faculty
Hunter College alumni
Columbia University alumni
Planetary scientists